Morpheus Photo Animation Suite is a suite of morphing and digital compositing computer software for Windows and Mac. The software suite contains Morpheus Photo Morpher, Morpheus Photo Warper and Morpheus Photo Mixer, although these three are also available individually.

The latest version is 3.17 and comes in three different editions: Standard, Professional and Industrial. The new version is integrated with YouTube, PhotoBucket, and Morpheus Galleries.  Galleries is a social network for posting and commenting on users' morphs, and it lets you upload further to Facebook, MySpace, Blogger, and other sites.

External links 
 

Windows graphics-related software